is a Japanese tokusatsu television series. It is the tenth installment of the popular Kamen Rider Series of tokusatsu shows and the first of the series to air entirely in the Heisei period, as well as the first standalone Kamen Rider TV series since Kamen Rider Black RX and the first series of the revived run of Kamen Rider, bringing Kamen Rider into the 21st century. 

It was a joint collaboration between Ishimori Productions and Toei, and was shown on TV Asahi from January 30, 2000, to January 21, 2001, replacing Moero!! Robocon in its timeslot. Kamen Rider Kuuga is the first Kamen Rider Series to be broadcast in a widescreen (letterboxed) format, albeit cropped during airing. It aired alongside Mirai Sentai Timeranger.

Synopsis
Long ago, the Gurongi Tribe terrorized the Linto Tribe until a warrior acquired the power of Kuuga and defeated the Gurongi, sealing their leader within a cave along with him. In the present day, Kuuga's mysterious stone belt is excavated, freeing the Gurongi as they resume their murderous game on the Linto Tribe's descendants: humanity itself. But a multi-talented man named Yusuke Godai finds himself drawn to the belt and becomes the new Kuuga. He helped assemble the Science Police to fight the Gurongi to ensure the happiness and safety of others. But as the endgame draws near, Yusuke learns of a horrible revelation between Kuuga and the Gurongi Tribe's leader.

Characters

Main and supporting characters

 A 24-year-old (later 25-year-old in episode 9) young, multi-talented adventurer. He is a happy-go-lucky and honest person that fights to "protect everyone's smiles". Yusuke helps out at the Pole Pole while staying at the shop, and continuously attempts to master 2000 different skills and talents which he uses to help others. He lost his father, a war photographer, when he was a sixth-grade elementary school student, before losing his mother at the age of 18. He was born in Hokkaido on March 18, 1975.

 A 25-year-old (later 26-year-old in episode 15) assistant police inspector of the Security Division of the Nagano Prefectural PD. He is sent to the Unidentified Life Form Joint Task Force Office, which is set up in the Metro PD to investigate and counter the Gurongi. Like his father, who died on his tenth birthday, Ichijo is a model policeman who firmly believes in doing the right thing. Though he is very strict with himself, he will do everything he can, even bend police rules, to help Yusuke fight the Gurongi. After the Gurongi were defeated, Ichijo returns to Nagano. He was born in Nagoya on April 18, 1974.

 A 23-year-old friend of Yusuke from a university and a graduate student at Jonan University who translates the ancient "Lintonese" transcripts that tell of Kuuga and the Gurongi. At first, she was against helping because she was worried about Yusuke, but now she believes in him fully and works hard to help Yusuke understand his powers by deciphering the writings. She was born in Gunma Prefecture on October 30, 1976.

 Yusuke's 22-year-old younger sister who works as a teacher at Wakaba Nursery School. Yusuke occasionally visited her there to entertain the kids. Like Sakurako, she was at first apprehensive about her brother transforming into Kuuga, but she believes in Yusuke and helps out however she can. She was born in Hokkaido on September 4, 1977.

 A 26-year-old trusted friend of Ichijo from high school, he is the doctor who looks after Yusuke and treats him when he becomes injured, while also researching the effects of Yusuke's fusion with the Arcle. Though he's a light-hearted person, he was very serious and worried when talking about Yusuke's future transformations because of the constant dangers that surrounded the Kuuga legend. He also performs the autopsies of the Gurongi victims to determine the causes of death.

 A 34-year-old researcher of the National Research Institute of Police Science, she studies the biology of the Gurongi to develop effective weapons against them. She also assists in the study of Kuuga and the Gouram. Because of the massive amount of work required of her to fight the Gurongi, she was away from home quite often and her child felt lonely and neglected.

 A 44-year-old former adventurer, he was friends with the father of Yusuke and Minori, who affectionately refer to him as  like everyone else. He owns and runs the Pole Pole. He is a goofy, light-hearted character that keeps a scrapbook of all of Kuuga's exploits from the newspaper, though unaware of Yusuke being "ULF 04" and thinks that the name "Kuuga" is some nonsensical word made up by Yusuke. After learning the truth, however, he dons the Kuuga mark on his apron in the series epilogue. He was born on June 9, 1955.

 Tamasaburo's 17-year-old niece from Kyoto Prefecture, who helps out at the Pole Pole while aspiring to be an actress. However, since the death of her acting teacher at the hands of Gurongi, Nana has been troubled until Yusuke finally helps her overcome her sadness.

 A 27-year-old graduate student at Jonan University from France that shares the work office with Sakurako. He researched the broken fragments that later formed into Gouram. He has a crush on Enokida and hoped to help her reconnect with her child.

 The 57-year-old head of the Security Bureau of the Metro PD and the head of the Unidentified Life Form Joint Task Force Office.

 A 37-year-old detective of the First Investigation Division of the Metro PD who is also a member of the Unidentified Life Form Joint Task Force Office.

 A 26-year-old detective of the First Investigation Division of the Metro PD who is also a member of the Unidentified Life Form Joint Task Force Office.

 A 21-year-old policewoman of the Unidentified Life Form Joint Task Force Office who sends communication from headquarters.

 The 14-year-old daughter of Professor , and one of Daguva's victims, she was greatly depressed when her father's murder was being overlooked for the Gurongi attacks, taking the findings her father had at their house. But after Yusuke reasons with her, Mika decides to aid in the Gurongi matter as Jean's assistant. However, she is unable to follow and decides to take up playing the flute her father gave her. But while attending the 12th Arikawa Group Flute Competition, a hostage situation by a disgruntled government worker traumatizes Mika as Yusuke tells her not to run from her fear and continue. Three months later, Mika attended a special college.

 Yusuke's 52-year-old elementary school teacher, he served as an inspiration to Yusuke, and the two of them visit on certain occasions.

 A 22-year-old young troubled man, he saw the Gurongi as salvation until he was saved by Kuuga. He later researched trying to make a living until he was knocked out by  while on his way to a contest.

Gurongi Tribe

The naming pattern of the Gurongi is "Group·Species·Creature type": the first part denotes their rank, the second part is the personal name, and the third part indicates the type of animal they resemble. Only 25 out of the 200 Gurongi appeared in the course of the series.

In the series, the Gurongi speak in their own native language (originally created by the producers as a cipher of the Japanese language) which was left purposely unsubtitled during the original broadcast to prevent the audience from learning the series' mysteries and plot twists (as it was referred by them in the early episodes)).

The  are the judges of the Gegeru and are Daguva's right-hand men. The  crafts the artifacts used by the other groups. The  contains lower-tier Gurongi under Xu·Zain·Da, most of their kin slaughtered by Daguva as they failed to acquire the right to participate. Those who did qualify are brought into the Gegeru by writing their names on the portable  blackboard and using the beads of their  bracelets to mark the number of people they have killed. The  are middle-tier Gurongi led by Me·Garima·Ba, its members brought into the Gegeru by using the  abacus to predict the number of people they are to kill and the period to accomplish that. The  are high-tier Gurongi who can transmute their ornaments into weapons like Kuuga displays while in his Dragon, Pegasus, and Titan forms. Unlike the lesser tiers, the Go having La·Doldo·Gu tally their kills for them while creating their rules of conducting their kills. The Go who completes the Gegeru, or the one who can defeat all the Go class Gurongi, earns the right to fight Daguva for control of the entire Gurongi Tribe. Their leader is Go·Gadol·Ba, one of the three strongest Go Gurongi who had modified themselves to alter their forms like Kuuga and Daguva. The lowest  were all murdered by Daguva without acquiring the right of the Gegeru.

Spending most of the series killing 152 of his kind he deemed unworthy to participate in the Gegeru, Daguva resurfaces in his fully restored . After Gadol's death, Daguva begins his endgame with endless heavy rain and initiates a systematic genocide of all people in Japan. He is eventually killed by Yusuke after an epic fight that pushed the other to his limits, Daguva dies from his injuries while mocking Yusuke would become as violent as he is.

She serves as the judge for both Xu and Me Groups, authorizing any member of the Gurongi to enter the Gegeru. Following her many encounters with Ichijo, including one where he injured her, Balva realizes that humans can no longer be underestimated. Once Daguva begins his rampage, she is encountered by Ichijo who hints that humans will soon become like the Gurongi before running off, with Ichijo being forced to shoot her with eight nerve-breaking bullets. Her body falls into the sea and is never found.

He carries the Bagundada abacus which he uses to count the number of kills by the Go Group Gurongi until Ichijo destroyed it with a marking bullet. This forces the purposeless Doldo to fight for his life against Gadol as Ichijo arrives at the scene, Doldo ends up being killed by the Sugita and Sakurai using the completed nerve-breaking bullets.

 A salamander-like Gurongi and the last of the Nu Group, labeled . Posing as a middle-aged man, Zajio manages to remain in hiding with his existence unknown to the police while creating the items used by the Gurongi. With Goma's aid, Zajio obtains discarded pieces of Daguva's buckle and refines them to create a means for a Gurongi to have the same abilities as Daguva and Kuuga, so those in the Gegeru can defend themselves against Daguva. In the end, Zajio is eventually killed by Daguva just as he finished his final work. Like Balva, Zajio's true form was never revealed.

Following Xu being removed from play, wearing a trenchcoat and fedora to protect himself, Goma becomes Balva's underling. But Goma retrieved a discarded piece of Daguva's buckle and had it refined before using it to evolve himself into his  to have freedom of movement in daylight. But it also increased Goma's bloodlust as he turns on Balva and intended to kill Daguva to gain his power, driven off by Gadol as the final stages of his evolution take effect. Fully evolved into his armored , Goma nearly kills Kuuga when Daguva finally arrives. Goma runs off to fight Daguva, only to be slaughtered by him with his corpse used to develop the nerve-breaking bullets.

Soon after his group was removed from the Gegeru in favor of the Me Group, Zain starts acting on his own after the Gurongi Tribe's first lair was raided, attacking trucks and impaling drivers with his horn. He overpowered Kuuga in both human and Gurongi forms when  intervened as Zain stole his turn. While Zain resumes his attack on large motor vehicles, Yusuke manages to perfect his Mighty Kick to finally kill the Gurongi.

Originally , he is promoted between the Gegeru of Unidentified Life Forms 10 and 11, desiring to become a Go and playing a part in murdering Nana's acting teacher. Posing as a man with wild blonde hair, Galme's turn came as he uses his cloaking abilities to hide in high areas, dragging his victims with his tongue to hang them while smashing their faces against a surface, announcing his next location to kill, going for the Komazawa Square and then at the Central Tower, where the police stand by. Learning of a five-minute window, the police attempt to use flash grenades to disrupt Galme's chromatic cellular makeup while learning the reason for the Gurongi attacks. Though the visible Galme outruns the police, he runs into Kuuga as they battle. But once Galme turns invisible to escape, he is killed by Kuuga's Gouram-aided Blast Pegasus. The encounter with Galme, who tends to speak Japanese, together with Ichijo's experience with Balva, leads the police to realize that the Gurongi are capable of speaking their language as well.

Garima has a tattoo on her right pointer and thumbnails and a green streak in her hair while in her human form. While Galme begins his Gegeru, Garima receives a double-bladed scythe/lance as the Go arrives and she was on a train at the Ochanomizu Station, killing those in the 4th cabin as the others left. Deciding to continue playing as one of the Go, she tracks down the remaining 288 who left the train prior and strikes them down with her weapon, her victims unaware of their death until they look back to face her. When Kuuga attempts to fight her in Titan Form on the Gouram, Garima manages to endure the Try Gouram Attack and escape in the confusion, wounded but able to continue the Gegeru with her scythe-katana. She was about to kill Sakurako when Yusuke arrives at her aid, assuming Rising Titan and running through Garima.

The first of the Go to appear when he intervenes in Kuuga's fight with Goma before leaving the scene and then formally introducing himself when  starts to play. When his turn came, he begins to kill 99 motorcyclists. When the Try Chaser 2000 is damaged, Kuuga is left at a disadvantage as Badaa leaves with a promise to save him in his Gerizagibas Gegeru. By the time Badaa reached 98, he decides to finish off Kuuga. However, after being barraged with bullets, Badaa is driven into a secluded location where Kuuga meets him on the Beat Chaser 2000, outrunning him and assuming Rising Mighty before he fatally knocked Badaa off his motorcycle.

Armed with various weapons similar to Kuuga, he assumes the form of a man in militant garb. With Daguva going to Tokyo soon, he and the other two remaining Go Gurongi undergo the same process as Goma to ready themselves. After his two allies were killed, Gadol is the last of the Gurongi to play. After undergoing training to ready himself, Gadol heads to the police department to find worthy opponents to fight as part of his Gerizagibas Gegeru. But due to Ichijo, Gadol's Gerizagibas Gegeru had to be reset as the Gurongi attempts to kill Doldo for failing his part. After Doldo retreats, angry Gadol attempts to kill Ichijo upon being wounded by the officer's nerve-breaking bullets as Yusuke arrives to battle the Gurongi as Kuuga. Once taking their fight to the woods, Kuuga assumes Amazing Mighty and destroys Shocker Form Gadol.

Episodes
The title of each episode is written with only two kanji.

Specials
: Televi-Kuns special video. In the episode, Yusuke reads through newspaper clippings of his actions as Kuuga before he is called upon to fight a new Gurongi called Go·Jiino·Da. The video also previews Kuuga's Rising Mighty Form.
: A rerun of Episodes 17 and 31, and an extra episode, labelled as Episode 46.5 .
: A short extra episode, jokingly labelled as "Episode 50".
: It is compiled from the first two episodes with extra footage.

Production
Takeyuki Suzuki of Toei had long suspended the resumption of the Kamen Rider TV series, although there were voices of revival, saying that he should not make a halfway rider that would end up in 2–3 cool, and should be resumed when the time was ripe. Kamen Rider's TV series has been planned since around 1996, and there was a time when it was originally aimed at broadcasting on The Mainichi Broadcasting Production and TBS series at 6:00 a.m. on Saturdays, which was broadcasting the Ultra series. The initial title is "Kamen Rider XV (CrossBuoy)" and "Kamen Rider Kawakami" and the idea of appearing multiple Kamen Riders presented here has led to the idea of form change by consolidating the number of people to one person. Another project title is "Kamen Rider Gaia", which is said to have competed with "Ultraman Gaia".

The mainichi broadcasting was about to be broadcast, but then the mainichi broadcasting was Zoidsand Ultraman Because I refused to choose, broadcasting in TBS system did not come to realize, toei's special effects program Moero!! Robocon It was decided to change the production station to TV Asahi due to the fact that it is airingHowever, "Kamen Rider", which has been suspended for a long time, is already a past brand from the sense at that time, and TV Asahi was also a wind that reluctantly underwent "because there is no story".

It is 'Segata Sanshiro' to have become a tailwind. Hiroshi Fujioka, who played Takeshi Hongo (Kamen Rider No. 1) in Kamen Rider, the same character played by the same character enlivened the popularity rekindle of Kamen Rider. According to Takeyuki Suzuki, this excitement led to the birth of this work. Producer Nariki Takatera also testified that the Kamen Rider Series of prizes in the prize game was also boosting sales. At the time, it was vaguely perceived as a "positive reaction", but this was a sign that the age group coming to the game center became interested in riders, and it was the beginning of viewers of the old work becoming fathers and forming "two generations of parents and children" fans.

Nariki Takatera's plan "Kamen Rider Guardian" has a clear style with a strong hero color, and there is a remnant of Yusuke's character setting. At this point, Takatera had envisioned a line of traditional hero programs so as not to disappoint the expectations of related companies. After that, the plan proposal submitted by Ishimori Pro Kamen Rider OtisAsked to reconsider the direction because of the strong horror color and tragedy, Takatera decided to drastically review it. In other tentative titles, there was also a plan called "Ouja" after the notation in Kanji was proposed.

Takatera's enthusiasm for creating a completely new Kamen Rider was strong, but he said that it would take a budget equivalent to Indiana Jones to realize the fantastic and unconventional hero image of the initial plan, In response to the point that the "half-earthling and alien" setting is too far from the rider's image, we decided to explore ways to add new flavors to traditional riders.

Takatera's idea of "Kamen Rider-likeness" was the composition of "Man and Man" with live figures such as Kazuya Taki and Tobei Tachibana next to a strange hero called Rider. This is used in an actual work in the form of a buddy of Yusuke and Kaoru Ichijo. On the other hand, the element "remodeled human", which was the basic setting of the old work, was considered not to be mandatory and was excluded.

Toei announced a new project, in May 1999. Kuuga was part of a Kamen Rider revival project that Ishinomori had worked on in 1997, planning for a leadup into the 30th anniversary. However, Ishinomori died before he could see these shows materialize. During the summer of 1999, Kuuga became publicized through magazine ads and commercials.

The Kamen Rider Kuuga trademark was registered by Toei on November 8, 1999.

Kuuga also marks Toei's very first Kamen Rider series to be shot in 1080i, though the broadcast, including the recent home video releases, has been scaled down to Standard definition instead.

Manga
 is a manga adaptation, published in the TeleCoro Comic magazine. It took place between Episodes 22 and 23.

On November 1, 2014, a manga adaptation of Kuuga began serialization in Hero's Inc.'s Monthly Hero's magazine. It is written by Toshiki Inoue and illustrated by Hitotsu Yokoshima with the characters of Kamen Rider Agito added. On October 30, 2020, after Monthly Hero's ceased publication, the series was transferred to the Comiplex website. On April 28, 2022, the series was licensed by Titan Publishing Group for English publication under their new manga imprint.

S.I.C. Hero Saga
Kuuga had two S.I.C. Hero Saga stories published in Monthly Hobby Japan magazine. The first titled  written by series producer Shigenori Takatera expands upon the mythology of Kuuga featuring original characters , the previous Kuuga chosen by the Linto, and the original . The second story Masked Rider Kuuga Edition: Dark Side continues the expansion of the series mythology. Odyssey ran from February to May 2002. Dark Side ran in a separate special issue titled Hobby Japan Mook S.I.C. Official Diorama Story S.I.C. Hero Saga vol.2.

Odyssey chapter titles

Novel
, written by Naruhisa Arakawa, is part of a series of spin-off novel adaptions of the Heisei Era Kamen Riders. The story takes place 12 years after the series, where Yusuke Godai defeated the Gurongi as Kamen Rider Kuuga. Ichijo is still trying to research the remains of the Gurongi Tribe until rumors of a mysterious  surfaces on the internet, which reminds Ichijo of Godai. The novel was originally planned to be released on November 30, 2012, however, it was delayed until June 2013.

Video game
A video game based on the series, developed by KAZe and published by Bandai, was released in Japan on December 21, 2000 for the PlayStation. It is a fighting game similar to Tekken.

International broadcast
  TV3
  RCTI
  Spacetoon

Cast
Yusuke Godai: 
Kaoru Ichijo: 
Sakurako Sawatari: 
Pops (Tamasaburo Kazari): 
Minori Godai:  (Played as )
Shuichi Tsubaki: 
Hikari Enokida: 
Nana Asahina: 
Jean Michel Sorrel: 
Mika Natsume: 
Sadao Matsukura: 
Morimichi Sugita: 
Tsuyoshi Sakurai: 
Nozomi Sasayama: 
: 
: 
: 
: 
Akiji Kanzaki: 
Junichi Chono: 
: 
: 
: 
: 
: 
: 
Woman With the Rose Tattoo (La·Balva·De): 
Xu·Goma·Gu: 
Xu·Zain·Da: 
Me·Galme·Re: 
Me·Garima·Ba:  (Played as )
Nu·Zajio·Re: 
, Go·Badaa·Ba: 
La·Doldo·Gu: 
Go·Gadol·Ba: 
N·Daguva·Zeba: 
Narration:

Theme songs
Opening theme

Lyrics: Shoko Fujibayashi
Composition & Arrangement: Toshihiko Sahashi
Artist: Masayuki Tanaka

Ending theme

Lyrics: Shoko Fujibayashi
Composition & Arrangement: Toshihiko Sahashi
Artist: Jin Hashimoto

See also
Odagiri effect a television phenomenon named after Joe Odagiri which first occurred in Kamen Rider Kuuga.

Home Video
Scheduled to be released in US on Blu-ray by Shout! Factory September 20, 2022, including an option to have Gurongi given English subtitles or not.

References

External links

Kamen Rider Kuuga DVD & Blu-ray Box

Kuuga
2000 Japanese television series debuts
2001 Japanese television series endings
2014 manga
Comics based on television series
Japanese supernatural television series
Japanese horror fiction television series
Dark fantasy television series
Titan Books titles